Artur Rolén (5 May 1894 – 1 May 1972) was a Swedish stage and film actor.  He acted prolifically in Swedish cinema for several decades as a character actor. He had a long-running role as Klabbarparn in the Åsa-Nisse comedy series.

Selected filmography

 The Outlaw and His Wife (1918)
 The Österman Brothers' Virago (1932)
 Fridolf in the Lion's Den (1933)
 Whalers (1939)
 Nothing But the Truth (1939)
 Frestelse (1940)
 Kiss Her! (1940)
 The Bjorck Family (1940)
 The Crazy Family (1940)
 Lärarinna på vift (1941)
 Woman on Board (1941)
 Dunungen (1941)
 The Train Leaves at Nine (1941)
 The Poor Millionaire (1941)
 Ride Tonight! (1942)
 The Sin of Anna Lans (1943)
 Men of the Navy (1943)
 There's a Fire Burning (1943)
 Captured by a Voice (1943)
 In Darkest Smaland (1943)
 The Brothers' Woman (1943)
 A Girl for Me (1943)
 The Sixth Shot (1943)
 The Forest Is Our Heritage (1944)
 Skipper Jansson (1944)
 Blizzard (1944)
 The Girls in Smaland (1945)
 The Österman Brothers' Virago (1945)
 Meeting in the Night (1946)
 Harald the Stalwart (1946)
 Affairs of a Model (1946)
 Two Women (1947)
 Poor Little Sven (1947)
 Rail Workers (1947)
 Soldier's Reminder (1947)
 The Girl from the Marsh Croft (1947)
 A Swedish Tiger (1948)
 Life at Forsbyholm Manor (1948)
 Lars Hård (1948)
 Vagabond Blacksmiths (1949)
 Woman in White (1949)
 Realm of Man (1949)
 Sven Tusan (1949)
 Åsa-Nisse (1949)
 Dangerous Spring (1949)
Åsa-Nisse Goes Hunting (1950)
 Andersson's Kalle (1950)
 When Love Came to the Village (1950)
 Restaurant Intim (1950)
 Fiancée for Hire (1950)
 Åsa-Nisse on Holiday (1953)
 Speed Fever (1953)
 Ursula, the Girl from the Finnish Forests (1953)
 The Red Horses (1954)
 Åsa-Nisse in Military Uniform (1958)
 Åsa-Nisse as a Policeman (1960)
 Åsa-Nisse på Mallorca (1962)

References

Bibliography
  Cowie, Peter Françoise Buquet, Risto Pitkänen & Godfried Talboom. Scandinavian Cinema: A Survey of the Films and Film-makers of Denmark, Finland, Iceland, Norway, and Sweden. Tantivy Press, 1992.
 Furhammar, Leif. Filmen i Sverige: en historia i tio kapitel. Wiken, 1993.

External links

1894 births
1972 deaths
Swedish male film actors
Swedish male silent film actors
Swedish male stage actors
20th-century Swedish male actors
Actors from Gothenburg